Comarum palustre (syn. Potentilla palustris), known by the common names purple marshlocks, swamp cinquefoil and marsh cinquefoil, is a common waterside shrub. It has a circumboreal distribution, occurring throughout North America, Europe, and Asia, particularly the northern regions. It is most commonly found on lake shores, marshy riversides and stream margins, often partly submerged with foliage floating. It is a parent of some Fragaria–Comarum hybrids, ornamental plants produced by crossing with strawberries.

Description
Its branches spread into leaves with three to seven narrow leaflets which are sharply jagged. The stem is a reddish-brown, low sprawling, vine-like structure. Flowers extend from the branch which vary from red to purple, and are about one inch in diameter, blooming in summer.

Cultivation
Swamp cinquefoil prefers peat soils but can also grow in moist sandy areas. It flourishes in USDA Zone 3 (minimum ).

References

External links
 Jepson Manual Treatment
 
 
 Washington Burke Museum
 
 Wildflower.org.uk description

Potentilleae
Plants described in 1753
Taxa named by Carl Linnaeus